This is a list of restaurant districts and streets. Restaurant districts and streets are sometimes referred to as "restaurant row".

Restaurant districts and streets

 Andra långgatan
 Barrio Bellavista
 Barrio Chino (Buenos Aires)
 Barrio Chino (Lima)
 Barrio Lastarria
 Chinatown, Kolkata
 Courtenay Place, Wellington
 Gali Paranthe Wali
 Jimbaran
 Moses Mabhida Stadium
 Nokdu Street
 Paseo Tablado La Guancha
 Rue de Berne
 Rue Gouraud
 Rue Princesse
 Skadarlija
 Tangra, Kolkata
 Trastevere
 Van Wesenbekestraat
 Žižkov

Australia

 Acland Street, Melbourne
 Brunswick Street, Brisbane
 Carlton, Victoria
 Caxton Street, Brisbane
 Chinatown, Adelaide
 Chinatown, Sydney
 Elizabeth Street, Hobart
 Gouger Street, Adelaide
 Kings Cross, Sydney
 Little Italy, Melbourne
 Lygon Street, Carlton
 Northbridge, Western Australia
 Norton Street, Leichhardt
 Racecourse Road, Brisbane
 South Terrace, Fremantle
 Stanley Street, East Sydney

Bangladesh
 Nazirabazar

Brazil
 Lapa, Rio de Janeiro
 Rua Farme de Amoedo
 Vila Madalena

Canada

 Chinatown, Ottawa
 Chinatown, Toronto
 Côte-des-Neiges Road
 Côte-Saint-Luc Road
 Crescent Street
 Distillery District
 George Street, St. John's
 Greektown, Toronto
 Le Quartier Chinois
 La Petite-Italie
 Little Italy, Toronto
 Little Italy, Vancouver
 Pizza Corner (Halifax)
 Saint Denis Street

China

 Hengshan Road, Shanghai
 Qibao Old Town, Shanghai
 Rua do Cunha, Macao

Hong Kong
 Cochrane Street
 Kimberley Street
 Knutsford Terrace
 Lan Kwai Fong
 Soho, Hong Kong
 Starstreet Precinct

Denmark
 Jomfru Ane Gade
 Nyhavn

France

 The Latin Quarter in Paris, including Rue de la Huchette, Rue Saint-Séverin, and the Montagne Sainte-Geneviève
 Rue Montorgueil, Paris
 Rue Mercière, Lyon
 Rue des Marronniers, Lyon
 The Vieux Lyon (Old Town) district of Lyon
 Le Suquet, Cannes
 The Vieux Tours (Old Town) district of Tours
 Le Vaugueux, Caen

Germany

 Altstadt (Düsseldorf)
 Berlin:
 Kopenhagener Straße
 Nikolaiviertel
 Oranienburger Straße
 Bermudadreieck, Bochum
 Duisburg Inner Harbour
 Freßgass, Frankfurt
 St. Pauli, Hamburg

India
 VV Puram Food Street, Bangalore
 Khau Gali, Mumbai
 Zakaria Street, Kolkata

Iran
 Lashgar Abad Street, Ahwaz
 30 Tir Street, Tehran

Japan
 Kobe Chinatown
 Nakasu (Edo)
 Okonomi-mura
 Shinjuku Golden Gai
 Yokohama Chinatown

Mexico
 Chinatown, Mexicali
 Chinatown, Mexico City
 Colonia Roma
 Condesa
 Mesa de Otay

Pakistan

 Anarkali Bazaar Food Street, Lahore
 Boat Basin, Karachi
 Burns Road, Karachi
 Do Darya Food street, Karachi
 Fort Road Food Street, Lahore
 Gawalmandi Food Street, Lahore
 Gizri
 M. M. Alam Road, Lahore 
 Melody Food Street, Islamabad
 Port Grand Food and Entertainment Complex, Karachi 
 Qissa Khawani Bazaar Food Street, Peshawar
 Daulat Gate Food Bazaar, Daulat Gate, Multan, Pakistan
 Kartarpura Food Street, Rawalpindi

Singapore
 Boat Quay
 Club Street
 Holland Village, Singapore

Saudi Arabia
 Saudi Arabian cuisine
 Arab cuisine

South Africa
 7th Street (Johannesburg)
 Golden Mile, Durban
 Long Street (Cape Town)

Spain
 Albayzín
 Barrio Húmedo
 El Raval
 El Viñedo

Taiwan

 Shilin Night Market
 Snake Alley (Taipei)

Turkey
 Bağdat Avenue
 Beyoğlu
 Bostancı
 İstiklal Avenue
 İstinye
 Kumkapı
 Ortaköy
 Polonezköy

United Kingdom
 Golden Mile (Belfast)

England

 Alum Rock, Birmingham
 Bold Street, Liverpool
 Brick Lane
 Camden Town
 Canal Street (Manchester)
 Charlotte Street
 Chinatown, Liverpool
 Chinatown, Manchester
 Chinatown, Newcastle
 Curry Mile
 The Cut, London
 Greek Street
 Lark Lane, Liverpool
 Little Clarendon Street
 Walton Street, Oxford
 Wardour Street

United States

See also
 High Street
 Lists of restaurants

References

Further reading
 

Lists of streets
Lists of places
Lists of neighbourhoods
Districts